Naguladevunipadu is a village in Eluru district of the Indian state of Andhra Pradesh. It is administered under of Eluru revenue division.

Demographics 

 Census of India, Naguladevunipadu has population of 1485 of which 755 are males while 730 are females. Average Sex Ratio is 967. Population of children with age 0-6 is 152 which makes up 10.24% of total population of village, Child sex ratio is 877. Literacy rate of the village was 69.32%.

References

Villages in Eluru district